PVR Pictures is the film production and distribution arm of PVR Group, which also owns PVR Cinemas,  one of the largest multiplex companies in India.

History
The company has its origin is Priya Cinema in Vasant Vihar in South Delhi, which was bought by current owner 's father in 1978, who also owned a trucking business, Amritsar Transport Co. In 1988, Bijli took over the running of the cinema hall, which was revamped in 1990, and its success led to the founding PVR Cinemas.

PVR Pictures film production début came in 2007 with Taare Zameen Par and Jaane Tu Ya Jaane Na. It has distributed over 200 Hollywood films, including The Aviator, Mission: Impossible III, Kill Bill, The Hurt Locker, The Twilight Saga and Chicago; over 100 Bollywood films, including blockbusters such as ‘Ghajini’, ‘Golmaal Returns’, ‘All The Best’, ‘Don', ‘Sarkar Raj’, ‘Omkara’ and nearly 25 regional films since its inception. In October 2012 the company acquired the Indian distribution rights for the film adaption of Salman Rushdie's Booker Prize-winning novel Midnight's Children.

Its president is Kamal Gianchandani, and its current promoters are Ajay Bijli and Sanjeev K Bijli. Ajay Bijli is the chairman and Managing Director of PVR Ltd while Sanjeev K. Bijli is the Joint Managing Director of PVR Ltd.

Recently, the group had a tie-up with HP to open Asia’s first Virtual Reality (VR) Lounge at PVR ECX, Mall of India, Noida.

Films produced

Director's Rare
The Following films were released under PVR Director's Rare Banner.

Films distributed

Indian films
 Bawaal (2023)
 Bholaa (2023)
 Tariq (2023)
 Ghudchadi (2023)
 Gandhi Godse (2023)
 Dream Girl 2 (2023)
 Vikram Vedha (2022)
 Uunchai (2022)
 Godfather (2022 film) (2022)
Vikrant Rona (2022)
 Thank God (2022)
Bhool Bhulaiyaa 2 (2022)
 Don (2022)
 Velle (film) (2021)
Antim: The Final Truth (2021)
A: Ad Infinitum  (2021)
83 (2021)
Heropanti 2#Sequel (2021)
Sooryavanshi (2021)
Mamangam (2019)
Saand Ki Aankh (2019)
Super 30 (2019)
FryDay (2018)
Nanu Ki Jaanu (2018)
Reti (2016) 
Chauranga (2016)
Gujjubhai the Great (2015)
Gulabi (2014) 
Mahabharat (2013) 
Shorts (2013)
Bandook (2013)
Chhota Bheem and the Curse of Damyaan (2012)
Men Will Be Men (2011)
Khelein Hum Jee Jaan Sey (2010)
Action Replayy (2010) 
Soul of Sand (2010)
Antardwand (2010)
Lamhaa (2010)
Rann (2010)
Tum Mile (2009)
All the Best: Fun Begins (2009)
Blue (2009)
Aloo Chaat (2009)
Ghajini (2008)
Golmaal Returns (2008)
Phoonk (2008)
Contract (2008)
Jaane Tu... Ya Jaane Na (2008) 
Via Darjeeling (2008)
Mere Baap Pehle Aap (2008)
Sarkar Raj (2008) 
Shaurya: It Takes Courage to Make Right... Right (2008)
Victoria No. 203: Diamonds Are Forever (2007) 
Bheji Fry (2007)
Being Cyrus (2005)

International films in India
The Hurt Locker
Twilight 
Knowing
9 
A Single Man 
Love Happens
Blood and Bone
Astro Boy
The Twilight Saga: New Moon
Edge of Darkness
Remember Me 
The Twilight Saga: Eclipse
Step Up 3D
The Eagle
Drive
The Collection
Four Assassins
Escape Plan
Demolition
The Hateful Eight
American Hustle
Phantom Thread
Cold Pursuit
Parasite
Admission
Angel Has Fallen (with MVP Entertainment)
Hereditary
Good Time
Broken Embraces
Taking Woodstock
Agora
The Greatest
Burn After Reading
Blindness
Death at a Funeral
Playing It Cool
Jane Eyre
One Day
Another Year
Biutiful
The Rum Diary
London Boulevard
Rabbit Hole
The Ledge
Butter
Bel Ami
Paris, je t'aime
Ordinary Love
Moonfall
All the Money in the World
The Founder
Mia and the White Lion
The Space Between Us
Hardcore Henry
Mile 22
Bad Moms
The Foreigner
The Happytime Murders
Minamata
The Vanishing
Lady Macbeth
Falling
Zero Dark Thirty
Suburbicon
Maggie's Plan
Sky Fighters
The Gentlemen
My Spy
Pain and Glory
Midway
Logan Lucky
Chicago
Kill Bill: Volume 1
Kill Bill: Volume 2
Finding Neverland
Ella Enchanted
Bad Santa
Scary Movie 3
The Aviator
The Accidental Husband
Laws of Attraction
An Unfinished Life
The Butterfly Effect
The 355
Operation Fortune: Ruse de Guerre
C'mon C'mon
Blackpink: The Movie
My Hero Academia: World Heroes' Mission
The Father
The Mauritanian
Minari
Breaking News in Yuba County
The Courier
Six Minutes to Midnight
Memory
The Last Full Measure
Countdown
The Farewell
The Wild Goose Lake
The True History of the Kelly Gang
The Personal History of David Copperfield
Mr. Jones
Demon Slayer: Kimetsu no Yaiba – The Movie: Mugen Train
The Contractor
Hustlers
Gunpowder Milkshake
The Green Knight
A Private War
Fading Gigolo
Youth
Gringo
Voyagers
Cloud Atlas
Rambo: Last Blood (with MVP Entertainment)
Diego Maradona
Yomeddine
Ash Is Purest White
Foxcatcher
The Three Musketeers
Jobs
Killing Them Softly
Step Up Revolution
Confessions of a Dangerous Mind
The Hunting Party
Mr. Holmes
Miss Pettigrew Lives for a Day
Be Kind Rewind
The Other Boleyn Girl
We Are Your Friends
Legend
Sicario
Room
The War with Grandpa
Piranha 3D
Fair Game
The Imitation Game
The Mask
12 Years a Slave
Moonlight
The Wolf of Wall Street (with MVP Entertainment)
The Twilight Saga: Breaking Dawn - Part 1
The Twilight Saga: Breaking Dawn - Part 2
John Wick
John Wick: Chapter 2
John Wick: Chapter 3 - Parabellum
Dallas Buyers Club
The Woman in Black
The Host
Misbehaviour
Our Friend
The Secret Garden
Valerian and the City of a Thousand Planets
Miss Sloane
Shut In
Brick Mansions
The Family
The Way Back
The Program
Equals
The Idol
Trumbo
The Gunman
The Water Diviner
Her
Fury
Paddington
Paddington 2
Prisoners
Transcendence (with MVP Entertainment)
Wonder
Sicario: Day of the Soldado
Rock the Kasbah
Pompeii
The Phantom of the Opera
Scary Stories to Tell in the Dark
Shaun the Sheep Movie
A Shaun the Sheep Movie: Farmageddon
Message from the King
Letters to Juliet
August Rush
The Zookeeper's Wife
Replicas
Dan in Real Life
Three Thousand Years of Longing
Atomic Blonde
Point Break
Judy
Now You See Me
Now You See Me 2
Stardust
The Queen's Corgi
Palm Springs
A Hero
Spencer
Dog (with MVP Entertainment)
Parallel Mothers
The Secrets We Keep
The Rental
Brahms: The Boy II
Everybody Wants Some!!
The Nice Guys
The Man Who Knew Infinity
Eye in the Sky
Amy
Pride + Prejudice + Zombies
Triple 9
Mother's Day
45 Years
Carol
The Divergent Series: Allegiant
Robinson Crusoe
Pelé: Birth of a Legend
Mechanic: Resurrection (with MVP Entertainment)
Nine Lives
Skiptrace
Kidnap
The Bye Bye Man
The Sense of an Ending
Lion (with PictureWorks)
Aftermath
The Lost City of Z
The Kill Team
Bring the Soul: The Movie
21 Bridges
The Operative
47 Meters Down: Uncaged
Teen Spirit
After
The Wife
Extremely Wicked, Shockingly Evil and Vile
The Beach Bum
Destroyer
Fahrenheit 11/9
UglyDolls
The Old Man & the Gun
Siberia
The Sisters Brothers
Kursk
Destination Wedding
Book Club
The Mercy
Submergence
You Were Never Really Here
Hostiles
Den of Thieves
The Commuter
A Bad Moms Christmas
Mark Felt: The Man Who Brought Down the White House
Polaroid
The Hunter's Prayer
The Salesman
Unlocked
Dirty Grandpa
Truth
Sicario
About Ray
London Has Fallen (with MVP Entertainment, Panorama Studios and Niche Film Farm)
She's Funny That Way
Pawn Sacrifice (with MVP Entertainment)
The Gift
The Age of Adaline
Maggie
While We're Young
It Follows
Love, Rosie
Dragon Blade
Mr. Turner
The Woman in Black: Angel of Death
The Hunger Games
The Hunger Games: Catching Fire
The Hunger Games: Mockingjay - Part 1
The Hunger Games: Mockingjay - Part 2
Whiplash (with PictureWorks)
Kill the Messenger
The Expendables
The Expendables 2
The Expendables 3 (with MVP Entertainment)
Brick Mansions
Oculus
The Legend of Hercules
Lee Daniels' The Butler
American Hustle
Lone Survivor
Mandela: Long Walk to Freedom
Last Vegas
Ender's Game
Riddick
Out of the Furnace
The Mortal Instruments: City of Bones
Only God Forgives
The Place Beyond the Pines
Mud
21 & Over
Broken City
The Impossible
The Master
Hyde Park on Hudson
Promised Land
Arbitrage
Looper
The Ides of March
Spy Kids: All the Time in the World
To Rome with Love
Warrior
The Cider House Rules
Code Name: The Cleaner
Norma Jean & Marilyn
Little Nicky
In Bruges
Hellraiser: Inferno
Hellraiser: Hellseeker
Hellraiser: Deader
Jackie Brown
Greenberg
Furry Vengeance
Machine Gun Preacher
Fly Me to the Moon
Flashbacks of a Fool
Eastern Promises
Charlie Bartlett
Chasing Amy
Breach
Basic Instinct 2
Balls of Fury
Away We Go
Bandidas
What Just Happened
Van Wilder: The Rise of Taj
TMNT
The Young Victoria
Trumbo
The Strangers
The Runaways
The Queen
The Wicker Man
The Orphanage
The Box
Talk to Me
Rush Hour
Rush Hour 2
Rush Hour 3
Running Scared
Reservation Road
Red
Red 2
Closed Circuit
The American
Beginners
Being Flynn
Moonrise Kingdom
That Awkward Moment
Life of Crime
Somewhere
Hellboy (with MVP Entertainment)
Force of Nature
Horns
Devotion
Hannibal Rising
Turistas
My Boss's Daughter
Mimic 2
Next
The Prophecy II
All is Lost
Duplex
The Crow

References

External links
https://web.archive.org/web/20100724040147/http://www.pvrcinemas.com:80/investor 
https://web.archive.org/web/20100729161005/http://economictimes.indiatimes.com:80/articleshow/6218114.cms

Film production companies of Haryana
Film distributors of India
Film production companies of India
Companies based in Gurgaon
Indian companies established in 1997
1997 establishments in Haryana